Murdoch Mysteries is a Canadian television drama series aired on both City and CBC Television, featuring Yannick Bisson as William Murdoch, a police detective working in Toronto, Ontario, around the turn of the twentieth century

Total nominations and awards for the cast

ACTRA Toronto Awards

Canadian Cinema Editors Awards

Canadian Screen Awards

Directors Guild of Canada Awards

Gemini Awards

International Digital Emmy Awards

Writers Guild of Canada Screenwriting Awards

Prix Aurora Awards

Young Artist Awards

References

Murdoch Mysteries